Les Compères (English title: ComDads) is a 1983 French comedy film written and directed by Francis Veber, and starring Gérard Depardieu, Pierre Richard and Anny Duperey. The film had 4,847,229 admissions in France.

In 1997, this movie was remade as Fathers' Day in the US. When it was released in the U.S. in the summer of 1984, it received negative reviews from many critics. Siskel & Ebert gave it two resounding "thumbs down" marks on their TV show, stating that the movie was "basically a French sitcom" and had too many stupid characters.

Plot
A teenaged boy has run away from home. His father is ineffective at finding him, so his mother contacts two former lovers from around the time her son was conceived, telling them both that the child is their son and asking them to look for him. One of them (Depardieu) is a tough journalist investigating the Mafia, while the other (Richard) is a timid former teacher who was on the verge of committing suicide when he received the telephone call. The two former boyfriends finally meet, and together they locate the son. They both argue who is really the father. In the end the son tells both Depardieu and Richard (while the other is out of earshot) that his mother thinks that he is the father. Thus, the son adopts both of them as his fathers, and also reconciles with his real father.

Cast
Pierre Richard 	— Francois Pignon
Gérard Depardieu — Jean Lucas
Anny Duperey 	— Christine
Michel Aumont 	— Paul
Stephane Bierry 	— Tristan
Roland Blanche 	— Jeannot
Philippe Khorsand 	— Milan
Jean-Jacques Scheffer — Ralph

Trivia 

The title translates literally as "The Accomplices." It is a pun, as the word "père" means "father" in French, and moreover "compère" would mean something like "co-father", "confather", with the same (Latin) prefix as the English con-/com-/co- in words like "confederate", "accomplice", "co-conspirator", etc.

References

External links 
 
 
 

1983 films
French crime comedy films
1980s French-language films
Films directed by Francis Veber
Films with screenplays by Francis Veber
Films scored by Vladimir Cosma
1980s crime comedy films
1980s buddy comedy films
1983 comedy films
1980s French films